The 1934 Iowa State Cyclones football team represented Iowa State College of Agricultural and Mechanic Arts (later renamed Iowa State University) in the Big Six Conference during the 1934 college football season. In their fourth season under head coach George F. Veenker, the Cyclones compiled a 5–3–1 record (1–3–1 against conference opponents), finished in fifth place in the conference, and outscored opponents by a combined total of 132 to 66. They played their home games at State Field in Ames, Iowa.

Don Theophilus was the team captain. Four Iowa State players were selected as first-team all-conference players: guard Ike Hayes, ends Frank Hood and Fred Poole, and back Harold Miller.

Schedule

Roster

Coaching staff

References

Iowa State
Iowa State Cyclones football seasons
Iowa State Cyclones football